Paqu Paquni (Aymara paqu paqu sorrel colored, paqu a kind of edible herb, the reduplication indicates that there is a group or a complex of something, -ni a suffix to indicate ownership, "the sorrel colored one" or "the one with a complex of the paqu herb", Hispanicized spelling Pacopacone) is a  mountain in the Andes of Peru. It is situated in the Moquegua Region, General Sánchez Cerro Province, Chojata District, east of Jukumarini Lake.

References

Mountains of Moquegua Region
Mountains of Peru